Caina may refer to:
 Caina (moth), a genus of moth
 Caina Township, Qüxü County, Tibet Autonomous Region, China
 A section of the Cocytus in Dante's Divine Comedy